Talwandi Koka  is a village in Bhulath Tehsil in Kapurthala district of Punjab State, India. The village is administrated by a Sarpanch, who is an elected representative.

Demography 
According to the report published by Census India in 2011,Talwandi Koka has 177 houses with the total population of 758 persons of which 352 are male and 406 females. Literacy rate of Talwandi Koka is 74.78%, lower than the state average of 75.84%.  The population of children in the age group 0–6 years is 88 which is 11.61% of the total population.  Child sex ratio is approximately 913, higher than the state average of 846.

Population data 
 
As per census 2011, 151 people were engaged in work activities out of the total population of Talwandi Koka which includes 137 males and 14 females. According to census survey report 2011, 90.73% workers (Employment or Earning more than 6 Months) describe their work as main work and 9.27% workers are involved in Marginal activity providing livelihood for less than 6 months.

Caste 
The village has schedule caste (SC) constitutes 11.74% of total population of the village and it doesn't have any Schedule Tribe (ST) population.

References

List of cities near the village 
Bhulath
Kapurthala 
Phagwara 
Sultanpur Lodhi

Air travel connectivity 
The closest International airport to the village is Sri Guru Ram Dass Jee International Airport.

External links
 Villages in Kapurthala
 List of Villages in Kapurthala Tehsil

Villages in Kapurthala district